The following is a list of Georgia State Panthers football seasons through the 2022 season.

Seasons

References

Georgia State
Georgia State Panthers football seasons